Indiana State Road 44 (SR 44) in the State of Indiana begins in the west at Interstate 69 and State Road 37 (SR 37) in Martinsville and runs eastward to the Ohio state line in Union County in two broken sections. It is broken in Franklin from Indiana State Road 144 and Interstate 65.

Route description 
From Martinsville, its western terminus, at I-69 and SR 37, SR 44 heads east toward Franklin. Upon entering Franklin SR 44 ends at the intersection with State Road 144. (The route continues east as Jefferson St. and crosses US 31 and onto Forsythe and King Streets to Interstate 65.) East of Franklin SR 44 then begins again at an interchange with Interstate 65 (I-65).  SR 44 continues east towards Shelbyville.  SR 44 has a short concurrency with State Road 9 (SR 9) in Shelbyville.  East of Shelbyville SR 44 has an interchange with Interstate 74/U.S. Route 421.  SR 44 heads northeast towards Rushville.  In Rushville SR 44 has a short concurrency with U.S. Route 52 and an intersection with State Road 3.  From Rushville SR 44 heads east-northeast towards Connersville.  In Connersville SR 44 has an intersection with the northern terminus of State Road 121 and a short concurrency with State Road 1.  SR 44 heads east from Connersville towards Liberty.  In Liberty SR 44 has a concurrency with U.S. Route 27.  From Liberty SR 44 heads east towards Ohio; at the Ohio state line SR 44 becomes Ohio State Route 725.

History 
At one point , SR 44 went through Franklin, connecting the termini in Franklin.

Major intersections

References 

044
Transportation in Fayette County, Indiana
Transportation in Johnson County, Indiana
Transportation in Morgan County, Indiana
Transportation in Rush County, Indiana
Transportation in Shelby County, Indiana
Transportation in Union County, Indiana